The 1951 edition of the Campeonato Carioca kicked off on August 4, 1951 and ended on January 20, 1952. It was organized by FMF (Federação Metropolitana de Futebol, or Metropolitan Football Federation). Eleven teams participated. Fluminense won the title for the 16th time. No teams were relegated.

System
The tournament would be disputed in a double round-robin format, with the team with the most points winning the title.

Torneio Municipal

Championship

Playoffs

References

Campeonato Carioca seasons
Carioca